Brainard is an unincorporated community in Fayette County, Iowa, United States. It is located at the junction of Echo Valley Road and F Avenue, four miles southwest of Elgin.

History
 Brainard's population was 25 in 1902, and 27 in 1925.

References

Unincorporated communities in Fayette County, Iowa
Unincorporated communities in Iowa